Dominique Labourier (born 29 April 1943) is a French actress. Born in Reims, France, she is best known outside France for starring as Julie in Jacques Rivette's film Celine and Julie Go Boating (Céline et Julie vont en bateau, 1974). She has appeared in more than 40 films since 1968.

Selected filmography
 Les Oiseaux rares (1967)
 The Little Theatre of Jean Renoir (1970)
 It Only Happens to Others (1971)
 Beau Masque  (1972)
 Celine and Julie Go Boating (1974)
 Jonah Who Will Be 25 in the Year 2000 (1976)
 City of Women (1980)
 La Passante du Sans-Souci (1982)
 State of Grace (1986)
 Eugénie Grandet (1994)
 Time Regained (1999)
 Les Blessures assassines (2000)

References

External links

1943 births
Actresses from Paris
Living people
French film actresses